Malcolm Sylvester (born 13 December 1939) is a South African cricketer. He played in three first-class matches from 1967/68 to 1971/72.

References

External links
 

1939 births
Living people
South African cricketers
Border cricketers
Gauteng cricketers
Cricketers from Johannesburg